Potassium voltage-gated channel, Shaw-related subfamily, member 3 also known as KCNC3 or Kv3.3 is a protein that in humans is encoded by the KCNC3.

Function 

The Shaker gene family of Drosophila encodes components of voltage-gated potassium channels and comprises four subfamilies. Based on sequence similarity, this gene is similar to one of these subfamilies, namely the Shaw subfamily. The protein encoded by this gene belongs to the delayed rectifier class of channel proteins and is an integral membrane protein that mediates the voltage-dependent potassium ion permeability of excitable membranes.

Clinical significance 

KCNC3 is associated with spinocerebellar ataxia type 13.

See also 
 Voltage-gated potassium channel

References

External links
  GeneReviews/NCBI/NIH/UW entry on Spinocerebellar Ataxia Type 13

Further reading

Ion channels